Namsan (남산, "South Mountain") is an 821-meter peak in Sangju City, North Gyeongsang, South Korea.

Mountains of South Korea